Mount Oxford is a high mountain summit of the Collegiate Peaks in the Sawatch Range of the Rocky Mountains of North America. The mountain was named in honor of the University of Oxford.

Mountain
For this reason it is often climbed in combination with Mount Belford.

Historical names
Mount Oxford 
Oxford Peak

See also

List of mountain peaks of Colorado
List of Colorado fourteeners

References

External links
Mt. Oxford on 14ers.com

Oxford
Oxford
San Isabel National Forest
Oxford
Oxford